Kalvaria may refer to:

 Góra Kalwaria, Poland
 Kalwaria Pacławska, Poland
 Kalwaria Zebrzydowska, Poland

See also 
 Kalvarija (disambiguation), the name of two locations in Lithuania and one in Serbia
 Calvary, the site of Jesus's crucifixion after which all of the above are named
 Calvaria (disambiguation), multiple meanings